Chaque jour a son secret is a French thriller film from 1958, directed by Claude Boissol, written by Paul Andréota, starring Jean Marais. The scenario was based on a novel of Maria Luisa Linarès. It was shot at the Billancourt Studios in Paris.

Cast 
 Jean Marais : Xavier Lezcano
 Danièle Delorme : Olga Lezcano
 Françoise Fabian : Hélène Lezcano, la second wife of ethnologue
 Marcelle Praince : Mrs Lezcano, mère
 Denise Gence : Fina, la gouvernante
 Yves Brainville : Le juge d'instruction
 Robert Le Béal : director of "France-Europe"
 Germaine Delbat : une commère
 Alain Nobis : gendarme
 Raphaël Patorni : Yves Rollin, l'attaché de cabinet
 Raymond Loyer : doctor Destouches
 Simone Logeart :
 André Dumas : Tony
 Jean Michaud : minister
 Lucien Frégis : gendarme à vélo

References

External links 
 
 Chaque jour a son secret (1958) at the Films de France

1958 films
French thriller films
1950s French-language films
French black-and-white films
Films directed by Claude Boissol
1950s thriller films
1950s French films
Films shot at Billancourt Studios